Blakeslee is an unincorporated community in Tobyhanna Township in Monroe County, Pennsylvania, United States. Blakeslee is located at the intersection of Pennsylvania Route 115 and Pennsylvania Route 940.

A post office was established in Blakeslee in 1884 and named after Jacob Blakeslee, the first postmaster. The post office was located near Burger Road near his 300-acre homestead. Jacob Blakeslee would later serve as justice of the peace for the small community. The Blakeslee United Methodist Church was established in 1897. The Blakeslee Diner used to be a restaurant in Blakeslee, but it burned down a few years ago.

References

Unincorporated communities in Monroe County, Pennsylvania
Unincorporated communities in Pennsylvania